The 2022 Southland Conference women's soccer tournament, the postseason women's soccer tournament for the Southland Conference, was held from November 2 to November 6, 2022. The six-match tournament took place at the Lady Demon Soccer Complex in Natchitoches, Louisiana. The seven-team single-elimination tournament consisted of three rounds based on seeding from regular season conference play.  The defending champions were the Northwestern State Lady Demons.  Northwestern State was defeated in the semifinal round by Texas A&M-Commerce Lions 2–3.  Lamar Lady Cardinals won the championship by defeating the Houston Christian Huskies 1–0 in the semifinal round and Texas A&M-Commerce 4–1 in the championship final match.  The Lady Cardinals qualified for the Southland Conference's autobid to the 2022 NCAA Division I women's soccer tournament.  The championship win was Lamar's third in the conference.

Seeding 

Seven Southland Conference teams participated in the 2022 Tournament.  Seeding was based on regular season conference records.
 
Source:

Bracket

Source:

Schedule

First Round

Semifinals

Final

All-Tournament team
Source: 

MVP in bold

References 

 
Southland Conference Women's Soccer Tournament